Anar Rasul oghlu Rzayev, known as Anar (born 14 March 1938, Baku), is Azerbaijani writer, dramatist, film director, and the Chairman of the Writers' Union of Azerbaijan. Anar is primarily a novelist and short-story writer although in the past, he has also authored screenplays and directed films as well as acted in a film.

Early years
Anar was born to the family of Azerbaijani poets Rasul Rza (1910–1981) and Nigar Rafibeyli (1913–1981). After finishing a 10-year music school in Baku, he entered the Philology Department at the Baku State University. He later completed courses on screen writing and production in Moscow.

Works
Anar began publishing in the 1960s. His works include: "Longing for the Holiday" (Bayram Həsrətində), "The Rain Stopped" (Yağış Kəsdi), "White Port" (Ağ Liman), "A Person's Person" (Adamın Adamı), "The Sixth Floor of the Five-Story Building" (Beşmərtəbəli Evin Altıncı Mərtəbəsi) later used for the movie Tahmina, "Opportunity" (Macal), "I've Come to You" (Sizi Deyib Gəlmişəm), "Without You" (Sizsiz), "Summer Days of the City" (Şəhərin Yay Günləri), "Hotel Room" (Otel Otağı), and "Me, You, Him and the Telephone" (Mən, Sən, O və Telefon).

He has written the scripts for various movies including  Torpaq. Dəniz. Od. Səma ("The Land. The Sea. The Fire. The Sky"), Gün Keçdi ("The Day Passed") and Dədə Qorqud. Anar was the scenarist and producer of the film Üzeyir Ömrü ("The Life of Uzeyir").

Recognition
Anar has been recognized with the following awards: Honored Art Worker of Azerbaijan (1976), Azerbaijan State Prize (1980) and Istiglal Order (Order of Sovereignty) in 1998.

Anar is the President of the Writers' Union of Azerbaijan and was Member of the Supreme Soviet and National Assembly several times.

References

External links
Read "The Morning of That Night" in English – Azerbaijan International, Vol 7.1 (Summer 1999)
Read "Me, You, Him and the Telephone" in English – Azerbaijan International, Vol 12.1 (Summer 2004)
Short stories by Anar in Azerbaijani at AZERI.org

Volumes Published in English

Volume 1: Dante's Jubilee & Other Short Stories (2017) (PDF - Free download)

Volume 2: Hotel Room & Other Stories (2017) (PDF - Free download)

1938 births
Living people
Azerbaijani dramatists and playwrights
Azerbaijani film directors
Members of the National Assembly (Azerbaijan)
Recipients of the Istiglal Order
20th-century Azerbaijani dramatists and playwrights
21st-century Azerbaijani dramatists and playwrights
Honored Art Workers of the Azerbaijan SSR